Priscilla Hamby (born August 5, 1982) is an American illustrator and comic book artist. She specializes in Japanese manga style comics and uses the pen name Rem when published. She lives in Houston, Texas where graduated from the University of Houston Fine Arts Program in 2003.

Her break was in Tokyopop's first Rising Stars of Manga competition in 2003 as the Grand Prize winner for her work Devil's Candy. 
She then went on to do 2D character and environment designs on a video game called Fate of Ages by a now defunct company in England called Onisoft. In 2006 she became the artist for a collaborative project between Tokyopop and HarperCollins. The project was a manga adaptation of a series of novels written by Ellen Schreiber called Vampire Kisses. The subsequent manga series, Vampire Kisses: Blood Relatives is a spin-off of Schreiber's previous works. There are two volumes of Blood Relatives in publication. In 2007, she won grand prize in the Kodansha Weekly Morning International Manga Competition for her work Kage no Matsuri and as a result her short story was published in Morning Two magazine. She also worked on Tokyopop's Domo: The Manga. In 2012, she illustrated a 3 volume series called Soulless: The Manga for Yen Press, which was an adaptation of Gail Carriger's novels. In 2015, her oneshot manga Folie À Deux was published on Shonen Jump+ and digital version of Weekly Shonen Jump. In July 2019, she announced that she did some of the character designs for River City Girls video game by Arc Systems Works and WayForward which will be released in September 2019.

She currently is working on the Devil's Candy webcomic with Bikkuri.

Body of Work

Vampire Kisses: Blood Relatives

Volume I, Blood Relatives

This book is the first volume in a series of Manga that are based on the Vampire Kisses world. It is published by Tokyopop and is written by Ellen Schreiber.

The absolute last thing Goth girl Raven and her vampire boyfriend Alexander need is another hitch in their night-time only romance—but dark trouble hovers on the horizon when Raven and Alexander discover four freshly dug graves filled with empty coffins. When a crew of dodgy vampires takes up residence in Dullsville's lonely graveyard, Alexander finds this motley bunch is led by his very own blood-sucking cousin, Claude Sterling. Claude and his creepy crew can only spell out more problems for the pair, especially when Raven finds them in daylight attending Dullsville Highschool! What could Claude and his invaders be doing—or searching for—in Dullsville?

Volume II, Blood Relatives

This book is the second volume in a series of manga graphic novels that are based on the Vampire Kisses world. It is published by Tokyopop and is written by Ellen Schreiber.

Who says dating a vampire is easy? Raven's nocturnal romance with her immortal love Alexander is definitely dicey, but even more so with Alexander's meddling half-vamp cousin in town. Claude and his sketchy gang are on the hunt for a stash of blood-filled vials that can turn them into pure vampires. With an old family feud casting a shadow on the search, they will do anything to get their hands on the vials. Raven and Alexander must swiftly mastermind a plan to outwit them, but will the very lure of the vials create more risk for Raven than she could ever imagine?

References

External links
blackmoontides.com
Ellen Schreiber's Website
M.I.M.C. Official Website

American female comics artists
1982 births
Living people
People from Houston